Timothée de Fombelle is a French author and playwright.

His plays, which include Le Phare, Je danse toujours, and Rose Cats, have been translated into many languages, such as German, Italian and Greek.

Biography

Timothée de Fombelle was born in 1973 in Paris, but his architect father often took him to Africa.  Each summer, the family vacationed in the countryside in western France, where he and his siblings played in the woods, performed plays for their parents, and read the books in the library.  At the age of seventeen, he founded the theater group La Troupe des Bords de Scène for which he wrote and staged.

At first he was a literature teacher.  After teaching in Paris and Vietnam, he became a playwright.  He builds his own sets.

He made his debut as a playwright with Le Phare, which he wrote in 1990 with actor Clément Sibony.  Many of his plays, such as Je danse toujours, center on loss and fragility, but he sometimes writes comedies, such as Rose Cats.  Je danse toujours was read at the opening of the Festival d'Avignon.

In 2006, he made his debut as an author with Toby Alone, a young adult novel published by Gallimard Jeunesse.  The novel met with great success and has been translated into 29 languages.  It has received 20 awards, including the English Marsh Award, the Italian Andersen Award, and most French awards for children's literature.  The movie rights were bought by Amber Entertainment (UK, United States).  Toby Alone and its sequel Toby and the Secrets of the Tree tell the story of a boy a millimeter and a half tall who lives in an oak tree and must save it from destruction.  "To me, the trees are green planets and like these trees, my planet earth is also endangered," said de Fombelle.

In March 2010, Gallimard Jeunesse published the first volume of a new duology, Vango.  It takes place across Europe in the 1930s.  The two books are called Between Sky and Earth and A Prince without Kingdom.

The English-language publisher of de Fombelle declined publishing a translation of his 2020 novel , for being a book about trans-Atlantic slavery written by a white European man.

His wife, Laetitia, is an actress and amateur boxer.  They have a young daughter named Jeanne Elisha, born in 2004.  He is a Catholic.

Bibliography
 1990: Le Phare, play
 2003: I Always Dance, play
 2006: Toby Alone, novel
 2007: Toby and the Secrets of the Tree, novel
 2009: Celeste, My Planet, novel
 2010: Between Sky and Earth, novel
 2011: A Prince without Kingdom, novel
 2012: Victoria Dream, novel
 2014: Two lives of Mr. Pearl, novel
 2017: Neverland, novel
 2020: Alma, le vent se lève, novel

See also

 Toby Alone
 Toby and the Secrets of the Tree

References

External links
 
 

1973 births
Living people
20th-century French dramatists and playwrights
French fantasy writers
21st-century French dramatists and playwrights
Writers from Paris
French Roman Catholics
French writers of young adult literature